Çarıklar is the name of several small settlements in Turkey:

 Çarıklar, a town in Anamur district of Mersin Province
 Çarıklar, Germencik, a village in Germencik district of Aydın Province
 Çarıklar, Köprübaşı, a village in Köprübaşı district of Manisa Province